The Stadler Citylink (known as the Vossloh Citylink until 2015) is a series of tram-trains manufactured by Stadler Rail at its Valencia factory since 2011. The design was introduced by Vossloh España before their takeover by Stadler Rail in 2015. They are currently used in Germany, Hungary, Mexico, Spain and the United Kingdom, with more on order in Austria.

The Class 399 variant was placed into service on the Sheffield Supertram network from September 2017 as the United Kingdom's first tram-train; following the success of this trial, the Class 398 variant has been ordered and is due to enter service on the South Wales Metro from 2022. The largest order to date for Citylinks was placed as part of the VDV Tram-Train Project in January 2022, with a consortium of six Austrian and German operators ordering 246 vehicles with an option to order a further 258 afterwards. The deal is worth €4 billion (£3.3 billion), and is the largest contract in Stadler's history.

Design
They can also be produced to a variety of different track gauges, with models produced for metre gauge networks in Mallorca and standard gauge networks in the United Kingdom and mainland Europe.

Specifications vary depending on the operator; for example, the Citylinks operating in Sheffield are equipped internally similarly to the city's existing trams, due to the relatively short length of the tram-train extension to Rotherham, while Citylinks that operate over longer distances can be equipped with facilities such as toilets and luggage racks. Depending on the internal layout, Citylinks can have a capacity of up to 250 passengers.

The Citylink was designed as an electric multiple unit tram-train, with power drawn from overhead line equipment (OHLE) at 750V or 1500V DC. Some Citylinks are fitted with transformers to provide dual-voltage capability, such as those used in Sheffield, which run at 750V DC on the city's tram network, but with the ability to also use 25kV AC in the future, as is standard for British railways. In Chemnitz, Citylinks are fitted with a diesel engine as well as 750V DC overhead power to provide hybrid-electric capability; while vehicles sold in Mallorca and Mexico are fitted with a diesel engine only due to a lack of railway electrification. Citylinks have a top speed of  when operating on interurban routes under electric power.

Operations

Austria

Linz (future)
In January 2022, Schiene Oberösterreich (Schiene OÖ), operator of the Linzer Straßenbahn-Netz network in Linz, announced that they had ordered Stadler Citylinks for their network as part of the VDV tram-train consortium.

Salzburg (future)
In January 2022, the state government of Salzburg (through arm's-length company Salzburg AG), operator of the Salzburg S-Bahn, announced that they had ordered Stadler Citylinks for their network as part of the VDV tram-train consortium.

Germany

Chemnitz

Eight NET 2012 tram-trains similar to the Karlsruhe models, with options for two more, were ordered by Verkehrsverbund Mittelsachsen (VMS) for planned use on the Chemnitz Bahn network from 2015. In July 2015, a further four were ordered. Testing of the first tram-trains to be delivered commenced in September 2015. The Chemnitz Citylinks are fitted with a diesel generator to enable them to operate away from electrified routes, and they can also operate from 600 V DC and 750 V DC electrified lines. The centre section is also slightly higher, due to the differing platform heights in Chemnitz, allowing the doors in the centre section to be level with the higher platforms and the other doors to be level with the lower platforms.

The first Citylink entered service on the Chemnitz Bahn on 4 April 2016.

Karlsruhe

In October 2011, Verkehrsbetriebe Karlsruhe (VBK) ordered 25 Citylink tram-trains for operation on the Karlsruhe Stadtbahn network. The €75 million order also included options for a further 50 Citylinks. These Citylinks were known as the NET 2012, which stands for Niederflur Elektrotriebwagen 2012, German for "low-floor electric railcar".

The first Citylink was delivered to Karlsruhe in May 2014, around seven months behind schedule. Testing commenced on local railway lines on 19 June 2015. They are intended to replace high-floor trams on all lines except for Line 2, some of which are now up to 50 years old and are not wheelchair accessible. Following their successful introduction, a further 25 NET 2012 vehicles were ordered in April 2015, scheduled for delivery from April 2016 onwards. An order for another 25 Citylinks was placed in March 2016. 

In January 2022, Verkehrsbetriebe Karlsruhe (VBK) ordered 73 new tram-trains, which will be delivered from 2026 with an option for a further 52 vehicles. It placed the Citylink order as part of a consortium of six German-Austrian operators of the VDV Tram-Train project. As part of the same deal, Albtal-Verkehrs-Gesellschaft (AVG), the other primary operator on the Karlsruhe Stadtbahn network, ordered their own Citylinks for the first time, complementing those already in the fleet of VBK.

Reutlingen (future)
In January 2022, Zweckverband Regional-Stadtbahn Neckar-Alb (RSB), the operator of a tram-train network between the city of Reutlingen and the town of Tübingen that is currently under development, announced that they had ordered Stadler Citylinks for their network as part of the VDV tram-train consortium.

Saarbrücken (future)
In January 2022, Saarländischer Verkehrsverbund (SaarVV), the operator of the Saarbahn network in Saarbrücken, announced that they had ordered Stadler Citylinks for their network as part of the VDV tram-train consortium.

Hungary

Szeged

The Hungarian State Railways MÁV-Start ordered 12 trains for the Tram-train line between Szeged and Hódmezővásárhely. The first Citylink (as Hungarian Class 406 001) was delivered in January of 2021, and the testing of the 3-car units began in early March on the freshly rebuilt line between the two cities. The Tram-train service was opened in the end of November of 2021.

Mexico

Puebla
Two Stadler Citylinks were delivered to the state government in Puebla, Mexico for local operations in 2015. These are fitted with a diesel engine only, due to a lack of railway electrification in the region, and a revised front end crash structure compared to European models. These were the first tram-trains to be delivered anywhere in the Americas.

Spain

Alicante

Nine Vossloh Citylink tram-trains were ordered by Ferrocarrils de la Generalitat Valenciana for use on the Alicante Tram network's lines 1 and 3. They have a maximum capacity of 303 passengers and a top speed of 100 km/h, and are classified as the 4100 series on the Alicante Tram network. The contract for the construction of these units is around 43.3 million Euros and they are due in service in 2019.

Mallorca

Serveis Ferroviaris de Mallorca ordered six Citylinks in 2011 for operation on the new Manacor to Artá railway line, which was planned to reopen in 2012. However, construction of the line was suspended in 2013 and the Citylinks are now used on other lines across Mallorca. Due to the unelectrified railway lines on Mallorca, all of the Citylinks built for the island are only fitted with diesel engines; they are also built to the island's metre gauge.

United Kingdom

Sheffield
It was announced by the Department for Transport in 2008 that Sheffield would be used as the location for the first ever tram-train in the United Kingdom as part of a nationwide pilot scheme. Initially services were planned to be operated along the Penistone line from Sheffield to Huddersfield; this was later revised into a scheme operating along the Dearne Valley line between Sheffield and Rotherham Parkgate via .

In 2013, Sheffield Supertram placed an order for seven Citylink tram-trains for use on the new Sheffield-Rotherham tram-train, that opened in October 2018. The Supertram Citylink design is based on that of the newer NET 2012 trams ordered by Karlsruhe and Chemnitz in Germany. Three tram-trains are required to work the service, with three being used to increase the number of services on the existing network and one in maintenance. The first tram-train was scheduled for delivery in September 2015, although this was later set back to December 2015.

Under Supertram's numbering system, the seven units were numbered as 201—207; however, because part of their operation is on the National Rail network, they are required to be registered under the TOPS used for mainline rail vehicles, which led them to be allocated under TOPS as Class 399, numbered 399201-399207.

The Supertram Citylinks are dual voltage vehicles, capable of operating at the 750 V DC overhead electrification used on the Supertram network, and the  overhead electrification being installed on the Dearne Valley line to Rotherham and used elsewhere on the National Rail system.

The first Supertram Citylink was delivered on 30 November 2015. The final vehicle was delivered on 20 November 2016. The first entered service on the existing network in September 2017.

South Wales (future)
In June 2018, it was announced that for the South Wales Metro, Transport for Wales Rail will purchase 36 3-car Stadler Citylink tram-trains. They will operate in train mode north of Cardiff Central whilst switching to battery tram mode on the Butetown branch line. These will serve the Merthyr and Rhondda lines as well as the Cardiff City Line. These vehicles are the first to feature "smart-electrification" which allows Discontinuous electrification with permanently earthed sections around restricted structures. These Tram-Trains will switch to battery mode under bridges and tunnels negating the need for costly reconstruction of over 50 structures on the South Wales Metro.

References

External links
 Hybrid Tram Train Citylink Chemnitz, Germany at Kiepe Electric

Citylink
Citylink
Articulated passenger trains
Tram vehicles of Austria
Tram vehicles of Germany
Tram vehicles of Hungary
Tram vehicles of Spain
Tram vehicles of the United Kingdom
Sheffield Supertram